Ham Hyun-Gi (함현기; born April 26, 1962 in Gangneung, South Korea) is a South Korean footballer.

He played in the Korean Professional Football League (K-League) for the Hyundai Horang-i, LG Cheetahs in South Korea and in the former Japan Football League (JFL) for the Oita Trinity in Japan.

He debuted in the K-League in 1986 playing for the Hyundai Horang-i. In the K-League's 1986 season he was awarded the Rookie of the Year award for his outstanding play having scored 8 goals during the regular season and 9 goals in the Korean Professional Championship of 1986.

He was selected a Korean national footballer for the first time in July 1982. However, he suffered from injuries and was unable to play very many matches.

In July 1991, he was traded to the LG Cheetahs because of his high guarantee. However his next year was disappointing and he left the K-League and moved to Oita Trinity which was a lower division prefectural league team at the time. During his first season with them, the team was promoted to the Kyushu League. After the 1994 season he retired to teaching high school teams in Korea. He is now the coach of the Mukho High School in Donghae, South Korea.

Club career 
1986–1991 Hyundai Horang-i
1991–1992 LG Cheetahs
1993-1994 Oita Trinity

References

External links
 
 

1963 births
Living people
Association football forwards
South Korean footballers
South Korean expatriate footballers
South Korea international footballers
Ulsan Hyundai FC players
FC Seoul players
Oita Trinita players
K League 1 players
Expatriate footballers in Japan
South Korean expatriate sportspeople in Japan
1988 AFC Asian Cup players
People from Gangneung